Gerhard Ludwig Müller  (born 31 December 1947) is a German cardinal of the Catholic Church. He served as the Cardinal-Prefect of the Dicastery for the Doctrine of the Faith (CDF) from his appointment by Pope Benedict XVI in 2012 until 2017. He was elevated to the rank of cardinal in 2014.

On 1 July 2017, Pope Francis named Luis Ladaria Ferrer to succeed Müller as Cardinal-Prefect of the CDF.

Early life

He was born in Finthen, a borough of Mainz, then in West Germany. After graduating from Willigis Episcopal High School in Mainz, he studied philosophy and theology in Mainz, Munich and Freiburg, Germany. In 1977, he received his Doctorate of Divinity under Karl Cardinal Lehmann for his thesis on the Protestant theologian Dietrich Bonhoeffer and a second doctorate in theology, qualifying him for a chair in 1985, also under Lehmann on the theology of the "communion of saints."

Priestly ministry

Müller was ordained as a priest of the Diocese of Mainz, Germany, on 11 February 1978 by Cardinal Hermann Volk. He then served as a pastor of three parishes. In 1986, Müller was appointed to the chair of dogmatic theology of the Ludwig Maximilian University of Munich, where he remains an honorary professor.

Episcopate

Pope John Paul II appointed him as Bishop of Regensburg, Germany, on 1 October 2002. He was ordained to the episcopacy on 24 November 2002, with Friedrich Wetter serving as the principal consecrator; his principal co-consecrators included Karl Lehmann, Vinzenz Guggenberger, and Manfred Müller. Gerhard Ludwig Müller elected "" ("Jesus is Lord") as his episcopal motto, which is derived from Romans 10:9.

On 20 December 2007, Pope Benedict XVI reappointed Müller for another five years as a member of the Dicastery for the Doctrine of the Faith (CDF). On 17 January 2009, he was also appointed as a member of the Pontifical Council for Culture. On 12 June 2012, Müller was appointed as a member of the Congregation for Catholic Education for a renewable term of five years and was also appointed a member of the Pontifical Council for Promoting Christian Unity.

In the Conference of German Bishops, Müller was Chairman of the Ecumenical Commission, Deputy Chairman of the Commission of the Doctrine of the Faith, and a member of the World Church Commission. He was also Vice Chairman of the Association of Christian Churches in Germany (ACK) and the first President of the Society for the Promotion of Eastern Church Institute in Regensburg, Germany.

As a personal friend of Pope Benedict XVI, he was mandated to prepare the publication of the Opera Omnia, i.e., a series of books that will collect in a single edition all of Pope Benedict's writings. Müller has written more than 400 works on dogmatic theology, ecumenism, revelation, hermeneutics, the presbytery, and the diaconate.

Curial service

On 2 July 2012, Pope Benedict XVI appointed Müller to a five-year term as the Cardinal-Prefect of the Dicastery for the Doctrine of the Faith and made him an archbishop as well. He became ex officio the President of the Pontifical Biblical Commission, the International Theological Commission, and the Pontifical Commission Ecclesia Dei.

Müller said he hoped to halt the "growing polarization between traditionalists and progressives [which] is threatening the unity of the Church and generating strong tensions among its members". He continued by commenting on "traditionalists against progressives or whatever you would call them. This must be overcome[;] we need to find a new and fundamental unity in the Church and individual countries. Unity in Christ, not a unity produced according to a program and later invoked by a partisan speaker. We are not a community of people aligned to a party program, or a community of scientific research[;] our unity is gifted to us. We believe in the one Church united in Christ."

In an interview published on 1 February 2015, Müller objected to the criticism of the church for its mishandling of clerical sexual abuse cases and for its continued condemnation of contraception, same-sex marriage, and declared incapacity to ordain women. He said "Targeted discreditation campaigns against the Catholic Church in North America and also here in Europe have led to clerics in some areas being insulted in public. An artificially created fury is growing here which sometimes reminds one of a pogrom sentiment." His remarks were denounced by a variety of German politicians.

On 24 November 2012 he was appointed a member of the Pontifical Council for Legislative Texts. In November 2012, Müller said that traditionalist and progressive camps that see the Second Vatican Council as breaking with the truth both espouse a "heretical interpretation" of the council and its objectives. What Pope Benedict XVI had described as "the hermeneutic of reform, of renewal in continuity" is, for Müller, the "only possible interpretation according to the principles of Catholic theology."

On 19 February 2014, Müller was appointed a member of the Dicastery for the Oriental Churches.

In 2015, Müller described how he viewed the role of the CDF when the pope was not a theologian as Pope Benedict XVI had been. He said: "The arrival of a theologian like Benedict XVI in the chair of St. Peter was no doubt an exception. ...Pope Francis is also more pastoral and our mission at the Congregation for the Doctrine of the Faith is to provide the theological structure of a pontificate." Andrea Tornielli of Vatican Insider criticized Muller for inventing a new role not found in the statutes defining the CDF's role, adding that Muller was making far more public pronouncements than his predecessors were accustomed to.

On 1 July 2017, Pope Francis named Luis Ladaria Ferrer to succeed Müller as Cardinal-Prefect of the CDF. Müller chose to retire rather than accept another Curial position.

Müller criticised the way Pope Francis dismissed him as head of the CDF, calling it "unacceptable". He said that on the last working day of his five-year term, Pope Francis informed him "within a minute" that he would not be reappointed to another term. "He did not give a reason. Just as he gave no reason for dismissing three highly competent members of the CDF a few months earlier." Later that month a report commissioned by the Diocese of Regensburg sharply criticized Müller's handling while bishop there of cases of sexual abuse by priests.

In the context of Pope Francis' encyclical Amoris laetitia and its allowance of divorced Catholics receiving Communion, Müller criticized Francis' papacy, and Latin American theology in general, for lacking theological rigour.

Cardinalate
On 22 February 2014, Pope Francis made him Cardinal-Deacon of Sant'Agnese in Agone.

Pope Francis named him a member of the Supreme Tribunal of the Apostolic Signatura on 21 June 2021.

Views

Amoris laetitia
Following the publication of the post-synodal apostolic exhortation Amoris laetitia of Pope Francis, Müller stated that the Pope did not need to be corrected for false doctrine. Interviewed on 9 January 2017, Müller said that Amoris laetitia was "very clear" in its teaching. Müller said that Pope Francis asks priests

He said that in Amoris laetitia he "do[es] not see any opposition: On one side we have the clear doctrine on matrimony, and on the other the obligation of the church to care for these people in difficulty." However, in a second interview, Müller was asked whether the teaching reaffirmed in Familiaris consortio of Pope John Paul II, which linked the Eucharist to marriage, remains valid. Pope John Paul II stated that the divorced and civilly remarried were proscribed from the reception of Holy Communion, except possibly when they determine to live "in complete continence". Müller said of this condition that, "Of course, it is not dispensable, because it is not only a positive law of John Paul II, but he expressed an essential element of Christian moral theology and the theology of the sacraments." Müller also stated that "Amoris Laetitia must clearly be interpreted in the light of the whole doctrine of the Church." He has further stated that "I don’t like it[;] it is not right that so many bishops are interpreting Amoris Laetitia according to their way of understanding the Pope's teaching. This does not keep to the line of Catholic doctrine."

Abortion
Müller has criticized politicians who support abortion rights, including President Joe Biden. He has stated that "To demand abortion as a human right cannot be surpassed in its inhuman cynicism."

Doctrinal immutability
Müller has defended the immutability of Catholic doctrine from the attempt to adapt it to contemporary lifestyles, which attempt might be described as aggiornamento. He stated that such an approach introduces subjectivism and arbitrariness. In an interview with Die Tagespost, he claimed that placing "lived realities" on the same level as scripture and tradition is "nothing more than the introduction of subjectivism and arbitrariness, wrapped up in sentimental and smug religious terminology." His comments have been interpreted as criticism of the "shadow council" when bishops and experts from Germany, France, and Switzerland met in Rome to discuss how the church could adapt its pastoral approach to contemporary culture, especially contemporary opinions of human sexuality.

Liberation theology
In an interview by the German daily Frankfurter Allgemeine Zeitung (FAZ), Müller said that Pope Francis "is not so much a liberation theologian in the academic sense but, as far as pastoral work is concerned, he has close ties with liberation theology's concerns. What we can learn from him is the insight that there is no pastoral work without profound theology and vice versa." In the 1980s, the CDF under Joseph Cardinal Ratzinger attacked certain forms of liberation theology as borrowing "from various currents of Marxist thought." But during a visit to Peru in 1988, then-professor Müller discussed it with his friend and teacher Gustavo Gutiérrez, regarded as the "father" of Latin American liberation theology, who convinced him of its orthodoxy. Müller explained that liberation theology focused on orthopraxis, "the correct way of acting in a Christian fashion since it comes from true faith," congruent with the Gospel for the Poor, i. e., "for those on the periphery", to borrow the terminology that Pope Francis has repeatedly used. Müller said: "How can we speak of the love and mercy of God in face of the suffering of so many people who don't have food, water, health care, who don't know how to offer a future to their children. ...This is possible only if we are also willing to be with the people, to accept them as brothers and sisters, without paternalism from on high."

Pachamama affair
Following the 2019 Pachamama affair, Cardinal Müller broke with Pope Francis and defended the assailants who threw a statue resembling Pachamama into a river. He stated that "The great mistake was to bring the idols into the church, not to put them out."

Protestant churches
In a speech in October 2011, while quoting Unitatis Redintegratio of the Second Vatican Council regarding ecumenism, Müller stated that "the Catholic Magisterium is far from denying an ecclesial character or an ecclesial existence to 'the separated Churches and Ecclesial Communities of the West'."

Traditionis custodes
Cardinal Müller has been critical of Traditionis custodes, the motu proprio apostolic letter issued by Pope Francis restricting the use of the Tridentine Mass; having authored an analysis of the letter for the online publication The Catholic Thing. Müller has criticised the letter as "harsh" and contrasted the efforts of the Pope to curtail traditionalist Catholics with his response to the German Synodal Path writing, "Instead of appreciating the smell of the sheep, the shepherd here hits them hard with his crook." He also contrasted the suppression of the Tridentine Mass with the supposed introduction of pagan elements within the liturgy at the Amazon Synod held in 2019: "The paganization of the Catholic liturgy […] through the mythologization of nature, the idolatry of environment and climate, as well as the Pachamama spectacle, were rather counterproductive for the restoration and renewal of a dignified and orthodox liturgy reflective of the fulness of the Catholic faith." Müller was also critical of the elements of the document that seek to ascertain the assent of traditionalist Catholics to the legitimacy of the Second Vatican Council, despite the fact that many teachings of the Council are "being heretically denied in open contradiction to Vatican II by a majority of [non-traditionalist] German bishops and lay functionaries (even if disguised under pastoral phrases)."

US Leadership Conference of Women Religious
In 2012, Müller and the Dicastery for the Doctrine of the Faith initiated an investigation of the Leadership Conference of Women Religious. The member congregations of the Conference were ordered to review their statutes and reassess their plans and programs. The investigation was controversial, and was terminated by Pope Francis in April 2015, who "shrewdly let the nuns' case fade from his agenda". The investigation embittered many American Catholics "against what they perceive[d] as heavy-handed tactics by Rome against U.S. sisters who provide critical health care, education and other services for the poor."

Manifesto of Faith
In February 2019, Müller issued a "Manifesto of Faith" to Catholic media outlets. It is viewed as an attack on Pope Francis, who removed Müller from his role in a senior Vatican post. For the most part the manifesto represents a re-stating of the church teachings, such as celibacy for priests and the church's lack of authority to ordain women to the priesthood. One section appeared to repudiate Pope Francis's effort to open communion to divorced and remarried Catholics, an effort deplored by more conservative Catholics.

Clerical sexual abuse 
In 2012, Survivors Network for those Abused by Priests criticized Müller's appointment to the CDF because he had reinstated Peter Kramer in parish ministry after Kramer was convicted in 2000 of sexually abusing children. Kramer had completed court-ordered therapy. Müller did not inform those in Kramer's new parish of his past history. Müller had apologized in 2007 for mishandling the case.

In 2016, Fritz Wallner, a former chair of the lay diocesan council in Regensburg, Germany, alleged that Müller as Bishop of Regensburg had "systematically" thwarted the investigation of abuse in the "Regensburger Domspatzen" boys' choir. Georg Ratzinger, Pope Benedict XVI's brother, led the choir from 1964 to 1994. Müller insisted that neither the church nor its bishops were responsible for abusers. In February 2012, he said that "if a schoolteacher abuses a child, it is not the school nor the Ministry of Education that are to blame." He maintained that only the perpetrator is guilty. In 2016, a commission of 12 members was instituted to address the history of abuse and its cover-up in the boys' choir, a move critics viewed as long overdue. Wallner called for the church to purge any person associated with Müller, who had overseen the church's response to the allegations. In July 2017, a comprehensive report commissioned by the Diocese of Regensburg on abuse at the boys choirs said that Müller had "clear responsibility for the strategic, organizational and communicative weaknesses" of the church's response when the abuses were first reported.

Müller was included in a suit in France for his handling of the case of Cardinal Philippe Barbarin, Archbishop of Lyon. Barbarin was eventually acquitted in June 2020.

Honors

Orders
 : Equestrian Order of the Holy Sepulchre of Jerusalem (OESSH)
  House of Bourbon-Two Sicilies: Bailiff Knight Grand Cross of Justice of the Sacred Military Constantinian Order of Saint George of the branch of Infante Carlos, Duke of Calabria

Academia
 : Honorary Doctorate from the Catholic University of Lublin in September 2004, in recognition of his outstanding scientific and didactic activity
 : Honorary Doctorate from the Pontificia Universidad Católica del Perú on 24 September 2008

Other
 , Germany: Federal Cross of Merit First Class awarded by Bavarian Minister-President Horst Seehofer on 28 May 2009

See also
Cardinals created by Francis

References

External links

 
Gerhard Ludwig Müller

1947 births
Cardinals created by Pope Francis
21st-century German cardinals
Living people
Members of the Congregation for Catholic Education
Members of the Congregation for the Doctrine of the Faith
Members of the Congregation for the Oriental Churches
Members of the Order of the Holy Sepulchre
Members of the Pontifical Council for Culture
Officers Crosses of the Order of Merit of the Federal Republic of Germany
Roman Catholic bishops of Regensburg